Benedetto de Sanctis (died 1542) was a Roman Catholic prelate who served as Bishop of Alessano (1540–1542).

Biography
On 15 March 1540, Benedetto de Sanctis was appointed during the papacy of Pope Paul III as Bishop of Alessano. He served as Bishop of Alessano until his death in 1542.

References

External links and additional sources
 (for Chronology of Bishops) 
 (for Chronology of Bishops) 

16th-century Italian Roman Catholic bishops
1542 deaths
Bishops appointed by Pope Paul III